James Allan Anderson may refer to:
 James Allan Anderson (chess player) (1906–1991), American chess player
 Jim Anderson (swimmer) (born 1963), Scottish swimmer